The WWP World Ladies Championship is a women's professional wrestling championship in the South African professional wrestling promotion World Wrestling Professionals, contested exclusively among female wrestlers of any weight. It was created in November 2005 to coincide with WWP Thunderstrike's second season.

Title history

See also

World Wrestling Professionals

References

External links

World Wrestling Professionals championships
World professional wrestling championships
Women's professional wrestling championships